Davy Russell (born 27 June 1979) is an Irish National Hunt jockey. He was Irish jump racing Champion Jockey three times, and won the Grand National (twice), the Cheltenham Gold Cup and the Grand Steeple-Chase de Paris.

Childhood and amateur career

Russell was born David Niall Russell, the second youngest of six children, and raised on the farm of his parents Jerry and Phyllis Russell in Youghal, County Cork, Ireland 
. His father owned a few racehorses and the family walked puppies for the local hunt. As a child Russell’s passions were riding his pony, hurling, and helping his father with his horses.

Russell rode for four years as an amateur in point-to-points in Ireland, winning his first race in February 1999. During this period he also went hunting and worked in a fish factory.

Professional career

In 2002 Russell moved to Yorkshire, England, to ride for the England-based Irish trainer Ferdy Murphy at Middleham. Russell's first win as a professional jockey was on Inn Antique in a novice hurdle at Sedgefield, 12 November 2002. He gained many high-profile successes during his two seasons in England, winning the Peter Marsh Chase on Truckers Tavern in 2003 and also finishing second on the same horse in that year's Cheltenham Gold Cup. Other valuable wins on Murphy’s horses came on Tribal Venture, Ballinclay King and Historg. His first win as a professional in Ireland came on Colonel Monroe on 29 December 2002.

After 14 months with Murphy he returned to Ireland and spent a season with Edward O'Grady and then two years as a freelance jockey. He had his first Cheltenham Festival win in March 2006 on the Philip Rothwell trained Native Jack in the Cross Country Chase. Except for 2019, he then had at least one winner at the festival every year up to 2020, with his victories including the Gold Cup in 2014 on Lord Windermere, and a record three wins in the Coral Cup. In 2018 he won the leading jockey award at Cheltenham. Injury kept him having any rides at the festival in 2021.

In September 2007 he was invited to become Michael O'Leary's stable jockey at Gigginstown House Stud, a position he held until he was sacked after a win and over a cup of tea at Punchestown Racecourse on New Year’s Eve 2013. He continued, however, to ride for Michael O'Leary on occasion.

Russell was champion Irish National Hunt jockey in 2011/12 and 2012/13, having been runner-up the five previous seasons. In August 2017 he rode Balko Des Flos to win the Galway Plate for the first time to add to his two Galway Hurdle wins of previous years.

An incident at Tramore Racecourse in August 2017 led to controversy when Russell was caught on camera aiming a blow at the head of his mount, Kings Dolly, when she was playing up before the start of a race. Initially Russell was given a caution; this was later changed to a four-day suspension. At the hearing Russell argued that he had been trying to make the mare concentrate, and he criticised media coverage of the incident.

Russell won the 2018 Grand National at Aintree on 14 April on Michael O'Leary's Tiger Roll. At 38, Russell was the oldest jockey in the race, and, at 15.2 hands, Tiger Roll was the smallest horse. It was Russell’s 14th ride in the Grand National. In 2019 Russell and Tiger Roll again won the Grand National, with Russell becoming the first jockey since Brian Fletcher on Red Rum in 1974 to win back-to-back Grand Nationals on the same horse. 

In May 2019 Russell had his first ride in the Grand Steeple-Chase de Paris, sometimes known as the French Gold Cup, and won on Carriacou, trained by Isabelle Pacault.

A fall in the Munster National at Limerick on 11 October 2020 left Russell with a serious vertebrae injury. He underwent surgery and needed to recuperate for months, announcing in February 2021 that he would not be fit to ride at the Cheltenham Festival in March.

Russell retired on 18 December 2022 after winning the  Billy Harney Memorial Irish EBF Mares Novice Hurdle on Liberty Dance at Thurles Racecourse.

On 11 January, 2023 Russell announced he would came out of retirement to help Gordon Elliott and his horse owners after Jack Kennedy broke his leg. On 15 January Russell rode his first winner since his return. It was Sa Fureur at Punchestown.

Personal life

Russell is married to Edelle O’Meara, a science and maths teacher and former Irish pole vault champion. The couple live in Youghal and have four children, Lily, Finn, Liam and Tess. Russell also has a daughter Jaimee from a previous relationship.

Together with trainer Jim Bolger, Russell organises an annual celebrity hurling match in aid of the Irish Cancer Society. By 2019 the match had raised a total of over €1 million for cancer research.

TV

Russell featured in a TG4 documentary called Jump Boys. It followed the journeys of Ruby Walsh, Barry Geraghty and Russell over the course of the 2011/12 season. It aired on 28 November 2012. In 2013 he appeared in the documentary The Irish Road To Cheltenham, shown on RTÉ One television in Ireland.

Cheltenham Festival winners

Other major wins
 Ireland
 Alanna Homes Champion Novice Hurdle    -(2)  Dedigout (2012), Un Atout (2013)
 Arkle Novice Chase    -(2)   Thyne Again (2008), Some Plan (2017)  
 Champion Four Year Old Hurdle    -(1) Won in the Dark (2008)
 Champion Stayers Hurdle       -(1) Jetson (2014)
 Chanelle Pharma Novice Hurdle    -(1)   Forpadydeplasterer (2008)
  Christmas Hurdle   -(2)  Prince Of Scars (2015), Apple's Jade (2017)
 Dooley Insurance Group Champion Novice Chase       -(5) Quito De La Roque (2011), Sir Des Champs (2012), Zabana (2016), The Storyteller (2018), Delta Work (2019)
 Dr P. J. Moriarty Novice Chase    -(3)  The Railway Man (2006), Last Instalment (2012), Mighty Potter (2023)
 Drinmore Novice Chase    -(4) Cailin Alainn (2006), Don Cossack (2013), Death Duty (2017), Delta Work (2018)
 Future Champions Novice Hurdle    -(1)  First Lieutenant (2010)
 Hatton's Grace Hurdle    -(1)  Oscar Dan Dan (2009)
 Irish Champion Hurdle       -(1) Solwhit (2010)
 Irish Gold Cup       -(2) Sir Des Champs (2013), Conflated (2022)
 Ladbrokes Champion Chase    -(1) Quito de la Roque  (2011)
 Mares Champion Hurdle    -(3) Blazing Liss (2005), Oscar Rebel (2008),  Shop Dj (2011)
 Mares Novice Hurdle Championship Final    -(2)  For Bill (2010), Knockfierna (2011)
 Morgiana Hurdle    -(2) Solwhit  (2009, 2010)
 Neville Hotels Novice Chase    -(3)  Cailin Alainn (2006), Delta Work (2018), Battleoverdoyen (2019)
 Paddy Power Dial-A-Bet Chase    -(1)  Mansony (2007)
 Punchestown Champion Chase       -(1) Mansony (2007)
 Punchestown Champion Hurdle       -(2)  Solwhit (2009), Buveur d'Air (2019)
 Punchestown Gold Cup       -(1) Sir Des Champs (2013)
 Ryanair Hurdle    -(2)  Solwhit (2009), Mick Jazz (2017)
 Savills Chase - (1) Galvin (2021)
 Slaney Novice Hurdle    -(2)   Rule The World (2013), Envoi Allen (2020)
 Spring Juvenile Hurdle    -(2)   Pittoni (2010), Mega Fortune (2017)

 Great Britain
Aintree Hurdle      -(1) Solwhit (2009)
Maghull Novices' Chase      -(1) Ornua (2019)
Mildmay Novices' Chase      -(1) Quito De La Roque (2011)
 Mersey Novices' Hurdle - (1) Three Stripe Life (2022)

 France
 Grand Steeple-Chase de Paris -(1) Carriacou (2019)

References

External links
Racing Post Stats

1979 births
Living people
Irish jockeys
Sportspeople from County Cork
People from Youghal